Bayron Antonio Saavedra Navarro (born July 6, 1997) is a Chilean footballer that currently plays as a left-back for Chilean Segunda División side Rodelindo Román.

Club career
He made his professional debut playing for Palestino in a 2014–15 Copa Chile match against Universidad de Concepción on May 29, 2014. After playing for Palestino and Barnechea, on 2020 season he joined Coquimbo Unido, playing at the 2020 Copa Sudamericana.

International career
Along with Chile U20, he won the L'Alcúdia Tournament in 2015.

Honours
Palestino
 Copa Chile (1): 2018

Coquimbo Unido
 Primera B (1): 2021

Chile U20
 L'Alcúdia International Tournament (1): 2015

References

External links
 

Living people
1997 births
Footballers from Santiago
Chilean footballers
Chile under-20 international footballers
Club Deportivo Palestino footballers
A.C. Barnechea footballers
Coquimbo Unido footballers
Rodelindo Román footballers
Chilean Primera División players
Primera B de Chile players
Segunda División Profesional de Chile players
Association football defenders